Jennifer Hale is a 1937 British crime film directed by Bernard Mainwaring and starring René Ray, Ballard Berkeley and John Longden.

It was made as a quota quickie at Wembley Studios by the British subsidiary of Twentieth Century Fox.

Its plot follows a London showgirl who is wrongly accused of murdering her manager and goes on the run to try to prove her innocence. After establishing a new life as a taxi dancer in Birmingham, and falling in love with one of her clients, her past life comes back to haunt her.

Cast
 René Ray as Jennifer Hale 
 Ballard Berkeley as Richard Severn 
 John Longden as Police Inspector Merton 
 Paul Blake as Norman Ives 
 Frank Birch as Sharman 
 Richard Parry as Jim Watson 
 Ernest Sefton as Police Sergeant Owen
 Patricia Burke as Maisie Brewer

References

External links

1937 films
1937 crime films
Films directed by Bernard Mainwaring
20th Century Fox films
Films with screenplays by Edward Dryhurst
British black-and-white films
Films set in London
Films set in Birmingham, West Midlands
Quota quickies
Films shot at Wembley Studios
British crime films
1930s English-language films
1930s British films